Vitaliy Starovik (born 3 September 1978) is a Ukrainian football coach and former player who is currently manager of Chornomorets-2 Odesa.

After Angel Chervenkov left Odesa club, Starovik was appointed as an acting coach.

References

External links 
 
 

1978 births
Living people
People from Lutuhyne
Ukrainian footballers
Association football midfielders
Ukrainian expatriate footballers
Expatriate footballers in Moldova
Expatriate footballers in Belarus
Expatriate footballers in Russia
FC Zorya Luhansk players
FC Dynamo-3 Kyiv players
FC Dynamo-2 Kyiv players
FC Dnipro Cherkasy players
FC Polissya Zhytomyr players
FC Hirnyk Rovenky players
FC Shakhtar Luhansk players
FC Karpaty Lviv players
FC Karpaty-2 Lviv players
FC Karpaty-3 Lviv players
FC Nistru Otaci players
FC Torpedo-BelAZ Zhodino players
FC Iskra-Stal players
FC Krymteplytsia Molodizhne players
FC Dnister Ovidiopol players
FC Real Pharma Odesa players
Ukrainian football managers
FC Chornomorets Odesa managers
FC Mashuk-KMV Pyatigorsk players
FC Dynamo Makhachkala players
Sportspeople from Luhansk Oblast